The Ministry of Communications, Infrastructure, and Housing (Ministerio de Comunicaciones, Infraestructura y Vivienda, CIV) is a ministry of the Government of Guatemala. The head office is in Guatemala City.

References

External links

 Ministry of Communications, Infrastructure, and Housing  (English link does not work)

Government of Guatemala
Guatemala
Guatemala